Henricus exploratus is a species of moth of the family Tortricidae. It is found in Costa Rica. The habitat consists of cloud forests.

References

Moths described in 1986
Henricus (moth)